The Jackson-Gwilt Medal is an award that has been issued by the Royal Astronomical Society (RAS) since 1897. The original criteria were for the invention, improvement, or development of astronomical instrumentation or techniques; for achievement in observational astronomy; or for achievement in research into the history of astronomy. From 2017 onwards, the history of astronomy category has been removed and transferred to a new award, the Agnes Mary Clerke Medal.

The frequency of the medal has varied over time. Initially it was irregular, with gaps of between three and five years between awards. From 1968 onwards it was awarded regularly every three years; from 2004 every two years; and since 2008 it has been awarded every year.

The award is named after Hannah Jackson née Gwilt. She was a niece of Joseph Gwilt (an architect and Fellow of the RAS) and daughter of George Gwilt (another Fellow); Hannah donated the original funds for the medal. It is the second oldest award issued by the RAS, after the Gold Medal.

List of winners
Source is  unless otherwise noted.

See also
 List of astronomy awards

References 

Astronomy prizes
Astronomy in the United Kingdom
Awards established in 1897
British science and technology awards
Royal Astronomical Society
1897 establishments in the United Kingdom